Aden Ahmed Sugow is a Kenyan politician and a leading businessman from Garissa County. He belonged to the Kenya African National Union and later the Orange Democratic Movement. He was elected Member of Parliament for Fafi Constituency in Garissa County in 2002 and served until 2013. He was appointed Assistant Minister for Water and Irrigation in 2004 and was in 2008 transferred to the Ministry of Public Service as an Assistant Minister.

Aden Sugow is the Son of prominent and then powerful colonial Chief Senior Chief Sugow Ahmed. The Sugow family is one of the most prominent families in Northern Kenya.

With regards to marriage,Aden Sugow has followed in his polygamous father's footsteps and is thus married to three wives and is a father to 13 children.

Aden Sugow schooled at Bura Primary school and then later at the Nairobi School for his secondary education. He is a trained military pilot. He has a diploma in aeronautical engineering and a postgraduate diploma in military intelligence and International Security. He also has attained an executive MBA from the Jomo Kenyatta University of Science and Technology.

Sugow joined the military in 1981 as a cadet and rose through the ranks to the level of Major. He also served in the UN as a diplomat in Iran and Iraq. He retired from the military in 1997 and joined active politics. He was elected as Member of Parliament for the first time in 2002 and despite being a freshman was immediately appointed as Assistant Minister in the newly formed Narc government under Mwai Kibaki.

In  Members Of The 10th Parliament . Parliament of Kenya. Accessed June 19, 2008.</ref>

References

Living people
Year of birth missing (living people)
Kenya African National Union politicians
Members of the National Assembly (Kenya)